Owen Mitchell (born 24 October 1940) is a Jamaican cricketer. He played in five first-class matches for the Jamaican cricket team from 1961 to 1965.

See also
 List of Jamaican representative cricketers

References

External links
 

1940 births
Living people
Jamaican cricketers
Jamaica cricketers
Place of birth missing (living people)